For Real is a 1990s American band.

For Real may also refer to:

Film and television
For Real (film), a 2009 Indian film
"For Real" (Tanner '88 episode), a 1988 political mockumentary

Music
For Real! (Hampton Hawes album), recorded 1958, released 1961
For Real! (Ruben and the Jets album), 1973
For Real?, an album by Toshinobu Kubota, 2006
"For Real" (Athena song), Turkish Eurovision contest song, 2004
"For Real" (Okkervil River song), 2005
"For Real", a song by Lil Uzi Vert from Luv Is Rage 2
"For Real", a song by Tom Petty from The Best of Everything

See also
F'Real, an album by Murs, 1997
4 Real (disambiguation)